Sarah Jarvis is a doctor.

Sarah Jarvis may also refer to:

Sarah Jarvis, character in Action in the North Atlantic
Sarah Jarvis (skier), in FIS Alpine World Ski Championships 2011 – Women's giant slalom